Hladnik is a Slavic surname that may refer to
Boštjan Hladnik (1929–2006), Slovenian filmmaker
Feliks Hladnik (1915-2002), Croatian world art collector
Franz Hladnik (1773–1844), Carniolan botanist and schoolmaster
Miran Hladnik (born 1954), Slovenian literary historian